Konstantinos Laifis (born 19 May 1993), sometimes spelt as Constantinos Laifis, is a Cypriot footballer who plays for Belgian First Division A club Standard Liège, and for the Cyprus national team. He previously played in the Cypriot First Division for Anorthosis and Alki Larnaca. He plays as a left winger or at left back.

Early life and career
Laifis was born in Paralimni. As a boy, he played tennis to a good standard, and played football for the junior teams of his local club, Enosis Neon Paralimni. When he was 16, he took up an apprenticeship with English club Nottingham Forest's youth academy, together with several other Cypriot players. In his second year, he played increasingly regularly for the under-18 team and scored once as Forest finished second in their section of the FA Premier Academy League. He remained with the club into a third year, but returned to Cyprus in late 2011, where he trained with Anorthosis Famagusta and then agreed a short-term contract with them. His contract with Forest was cancelled by mutual consent, and he formally signed for Anorthosis in the January 2012 transfer window.

Anorthosis Famagusta
Laifis made his first-team debut for Anorthosis the next month, in their 2011–12 Cypriot Cup second round second-leg match against Second Division club APOP Kinyras, as a 61st-minute substitute for Vincent Laban. That was his last competitive appearance until July 2013, when injuries to Valentinos Sielis and Andreas Avraam left a vacancy at left back for pre-season friendlies. Laifis performed well enough to be given a place in the starting eleven for the second leg of the second qualifying round match against Allsvenskan club Gefle. He played the full 90 minutes as Anorthosis let slip a 3–0 lead from the first leg and were eliminated 4–3 on aggregate.

Alki Larnaca
Laifis was loaned to Alki Larnaca early in the 2013–14 season. He made 15 appearances, scoring once, in First Division matches, before returning to Anorthosis in late January 2014.

Return to Anorthosis
Laifis made 10 First Division appearances in what remained of the 2013–14 season, and continued as a first-team regular, with 24 league appearances in the following season and 29 in 2015–16.

Olympiacos and Standard Liège
In June 2016, Laifis signed for Superleague Greece club Olympiacos. He said "When Olympiacos makes a move, there is nothing else in a player's mind. It was the best thing for my career. I didn't even have to think twice. I am joining Greece's greatest club." A week later, they loaned him to Belgian First Division A club Standard Liège for two years with an option to purchase.
After half season in Standard Liège, the Cypriot defender is one of the most remarkable players till now. 
In Italy, Sky Sports reports that Laifis is in the viewfinder of three clubs: Fiorentina, Torino and Bologna. Three clubs added to the list that already contained Freiburg and other German clubs. His agent had just declared that the defender felt very good at Belgium and that he could not say more about a possible return to the Olympiacos. "I have not organized his loan to Standard, but the relations between the two clubs are excellent and the Olympiakos is watching him closely."
On 1 July 2018, after two successful seasons in Belgian First Division A, Olympiakos sold the international Cypriot defender to Standard Liège on a fee estimated to €1.5 million. Laifis signed a three year contract with the Belgian club.

International career

Laifis represented Cyprus internationally at all under-age levels. He helped the under-19 team reach the elite qualification round of the 2012 European championships, and made his first appearance for the under-21s in March 2013, when he played the first half of a 2–0 defeat to Belgium in a qualifier for the 2015 European under-21 championships. He played the whole of their next qualifier, a 3–0 win at home to Northern Ireland, and retained his place for a friendly in Romania.

He made his senior debut on 16 November 2014 in a UEFA Euro 2016 qualifier against Andorra. Cyprus won 5–0.

International goals
Scores and results list Cyprus' goal tally first.

Club statistics

References

External links
Laifis' profile at Anorthosis website
Laifis' profile at UEFA website

1993 births
Living people
Association football midfielders
Cypriot footballers
Cyprus under-21 international footballers
Cyprus international footballers
Enosis Neon Paralimni FC players
Nottingham Forest F.C. players
Anorthosis Famagusta F.C. players
Alki Larnaca FC players
Olympiacos F.C. players
Standard Liège players
Cypriot First Division players
Belgian Pro League players
Expatriate footballers in Belgium
Cypriot expatriate footballers
People from Paralimni